David McNally (born 1960 in Liverpool, England) is a British-Canadian director of film and television. He is best known for directing the films Coyote Ugly (2000) and Kangaroo Jack (2003).

McNally was born in England, grew up in Montreal, Quebec, and moved to Los Angeles.

Career
McNally began his career as a director of music videos and commercials. His most famous commercial was the Budweiser commercial with a lobster that aired during Super Bowl XXXIII. It was voted the most popular Super Bowl commercial of 1999 by numerous fans and publications.

In 2000, he made his directorial debut directing the film Coyote Ugly (2000), followed by Kangaroo Jack in 2003. In 2006, he co-created the short-lived drama Justice, serving as writer and executive producer.

References

External links

1960 births
Advertising directors
English emigrants to Canada
Canadian television directors
Canadian television producers
Canadian television writers
Film directors from Montreal
Living people
Writers from Montreal
Date of birth missing (living people)